Maui Fever is an American reality television series that premiered on MTV on January 17, 2007. The series reveals the daily lives of several young friends living in the Kaanapali area on the island of Maui.

Following the style of MTV's Laguna Beach: The Real Orange County, The Hills, and 8th & Ocean, Maui Fever was shot as a "reality drama" (in the format of a scripted television show). Maui Fever cast members never spoke directly to the camera or gave testimonials, a tactic used in MTV's The Real World and in traditional documentaries. However, a voice-over narrative spoken by Cheyne Magnusson, one of the main characters, was used at the beginning of each episode to set up the scene and tie together storylines.

The opening credits of Maui Fever featured the song, "Horndog" by Overseer.

Background
Producers casting for Maui Fever sought people who were willing to participate in the show and who were already part of a group of friends on the island. In June 2006, the producers of Maui Fever shot the pilot episode on location on the Valley Isle (Maui). After viewing the pilot and meeting with Hawaii's film commissioners, MTV executives gave Maui Fever "green light" status in August.

Filming of Maui Fever began on September 1, 2006, and continued for ten weeks. Initially the show was tentatively going to be called Island Fever. It is one of two MTV reality programs filmed on Maui in 2006; the other, Living Lahaina, began filming one week before Maui Fever but did not premiere until more than a month after the Maui Fever finale.

Maui Fever was executive produced by Steve Michaels, Jonathan Koch, Morgan J. Freeman, Liz Gateley and Tony DiSanto. They intended the show to be an homage to the sand-drenched beach films of the 1960s. From the initial concept, the show's creator (Freeman) and the other producers wanted to incorporate the feel and culture of Hawaii as though it were a "character," rather than merely a backdrop. Freeman described Maui as an ideal setting for a reality show because of its exotic scenery and spicy mix of tourists and locals. DiSanto likened the series to "a reality version of Cocktail." Producers sought to capture the allure of living on a tropical island in a state of "permanent vacation."

When filming of Maui Fever began, everyone involved was excited about the potentially vast and beneficial exposure for Hawaii. According to Hawaii's State Film Commissioner at that time, Donne Dawson, Maui Fever'''s producers were receptive to community and cultural concerns, and wanted the show to be as authentic as possible. Maui Film Commissions Benita Brazier also expressed strong optimism regarding Maui Fever, saying she was certain it would "put Maui in a good light," even though she knew there would be "some conflict of interest" (due to the usual content of reality television programming). Brazier indicated that she expected the producers to educate themselves about the island and "document the Maui that most visitors will never experience."

Reception
Some critics expressed skepticism as to whether the "reality" in MTV's Maui Fever was real. In the tradition of Laguna Beach and The Hills, Maui Fever has been called "MTV's latest faux-reality semi-scripted hit TV show." Many find that the aggressive editing tactics, used to mimic the style of a traditional television drama (rather than a reality show), make the scenes feel fabricated. In spite of this criticism, MTV's "reality dramas" have been popular, including Maui Fever. The show's ratings were successful, attracting millions of viewers each week.

In Hawaii, Maui Fever garnered a negative response. Even before the series premiered, rumors circulated that the youth and culture of Maui were misrepresented. Objections stemmed from the show's failure to represent the ethnic makeup of Maui. According to the 2000 census, Maui County is 31 percent Asian, 10 percent Native Hawaiian or Pacific Islander, and 22 percent mixed race. Caucasians account for 33 percent of the county population. However, all seven of the Maui Fever core cast members were caucasian. Due to the lack of racial diversity and the fact that very few of the cast members were long-time residents of Maui, at the time of the show's airing there were online petitions against it on websites such as MySpace. Locals were also disturbed by the show's sexual content, lack of cultural diversity and resulting misconceptions about Maui. According to State Film Commissioner Dawson, public reaction to Maui Fever was stronger than the response to any other Hawaii production.

Cast
The core cast of Maui Fever'' included seven main characters: Chaunte, Cheyne, Anna, Corbin, Anthony, Sean and Jesse. Additionally, the show featured several supporting characters, including: Kevin, Justin, Rachael, Jesse James, Katie, Bryce and Carrie. Everyone in the cast already lived on Maui prior to filming. When the show was initially announced, MTV indicated that the majority of the characters were born and raised on the island. However, it was later revealed that none of the core cast members were Maui-born.

Starring characters

Supporting characters

Episodes

References

External links
 
 Maui Fever fan site
 Maui Fever LiveJournal community
 Maui Fever on TV.com
 Maui Fever on Yahoo! TV
 Video trailer for Maui Fever
 

2000s American reality television series
2007 American television series debuts
2007 American television series endings
Television shows set in Hawaii
MTV reality television series
Television shows filmed in Hawaii